Edgar Allan Poe Museum or Edgar Allan Poe House may refer to:

Edgar Allan Poe House (Fayetteville, North Carolina)
Edgar Allan Poe House (Lenoir, North Carolina)
Edgar Allan Poe House and Museum, in Baltimore, Maryland
Edgar Allan Poe Museum (Richmond, Virginia)

See also
Edgar Allan Poe Cottage, in the Bronx, New York
Edgar Allan Poe National Historic Site, in Philadelphia, Pennsylvania